Borek Wielkopolski  is a town in Poland with 2,485 inhabitants as of June 2021. It is situated in Greater Poland Voivodeship since 1999; from 1975 to 1998 it was a part of Leszno Voivodeship.

References

Cities and towns in Greater Poland Voivodeship
Gostyń County